Toons.TV was a multiplatform entertainment channel owned and operated by the Rovio Animation division of Rovio Entertainment (known best for creating the Angry Birds franchise). It was available on most Rovio app-on-demand providers, smart TVs and other connected devices, as well as its own app. As of December 2014, its content was viewed more than four billion times.

As of August 1, 2017, the Toons.TV brand has been discontinued; its site and the app are shut down, and any links to it have been redirected to the Angry Birds''' official YouTube channel.

Final programming
Original programmingAngry Birds Toons (17 March 2013 – 13 May 2016)Angry Birds Stella (1 November 2014 – 11 March 2016)Piggy Tales (11 April 2014 – 30 May 2019; first 3 seasons only)Rocket Science Show (9 July 2015 featuring NASA, Special Journey to Mars appeared on 23 July 2016)Angry Birds Blues (10 March 2017 – 14 December 2017; first 10 episodes only)

Third-party programming
City Island by pbs kids  top wing 44 cats rainbow Rangers moka's fabulous adventurs doodle toons boon & pimento mugman Mr baby pip and penny bi ba boom teen z purr purr coach me if you can caillou rosie the giant iCarly teen titans go! KATURI RUDOLF Ben & Hairy fingerlings tales
 Om Nom Stories Hero Elementary
 Wallace and Gromit: Cracking Contraptions
 Shaun the Sheep: Mossy Bottom Shorts
 Morph
 Glumpers
 Canimals
 Takat the Dog Annoying Orange Transformers Oggy and the Cockroaches Zig and Sharko The Daltons Rintindumb Space Goofs Simon's Cat Zooville (Nat Geo Kids initiative)
 Hubert and Takako Log Jam Oscar's Oasis (Developed by TeamTO)
 Fraggle Rock Franklin (TV series) Limon and Oli Scaredy Squirrel (Creators Nelvana
 Chakra: The Invincible (also broadcast in Hindi at India only)
 AngryBirdsNest'' (Videos from the popular fan website of the same name)

References

Defunct video on demand services
Rovio Entertainment